What Did You Think When You Made Me This Way? is the fifth EP released by British rock band Nothing but Thieves. It was released on 19 October 2018 through RCA Records. The EP's first single "Forever & Ever More" was released on 27 August 2018 through streaming services and as made available as a download. The second single "Take This Lonely Heart" was released also on 19 October 2018 to coincide with the record's release.

Background and release

"Forever & Ever More" had its live debut at Reading Festival on 24 August 2018. The song had its radio debut on 27 August 2018 on BBC Radio 1 and was released to streaming and download services the same day. "Take This Lonely Heart" followed on 19 October 2018 as the second single.

The EP was released worldwide on 19 October 2018 through RCA Records as a digital download and physically on 12" vinyl.

Music video

The music video for "Forever & Ever More" was released on 19 September 2018 and was directed by Ivana Bobic. The video features BBC Radio 1 DJ Cel Spellman staying at a holiday hotel. The video deals with themes such as isolation, lust, religion and mental health with Spellman's character appearing to be a loose cannon throughout the narrative before revealing himself to be a vampire in the final seconds.

Critical reception
Clash magazine called the first single "Crunching heavyweight rock" and comparing the band with "pomp" of Queens of the Stone Age and "matching blistering energy" of early Foo Fighters. Billboard called the opening song a "pounding track" and praised Conor Mason's "operatic vocals".

Track listing

Personnel

Nothing but Thieves
Conor Mason – vocals
Joseph Langridge-Brown – guitars
Dominic Craik – guitars, keyboard
Philip Blake – bass
James Price – drums

Technical personnel
Jim Abbiss – production
David Sardy – mixing

Charts

References

2018 EPs
Alternative rock EPs
Nothing but Thieves albums